The palmar radiocarpal ligament (anterior ligament, volar radiocarpal ligament) is a broad membranous band, attached above to the distal end of the radius, and passing downward to the  scaphoid, lunate, triquetrum and capitate of the carpal bones in the wrist.

In addition to this broad membrane, there is a rounded fasciculus, superficial to the rest, which reaches from the base of the styloid process of the ulna to the lunate and triangular bones.

Perforations
The ligament is perforated by apertures for the passage of vessels,

Relations
It is in relation, in front, with the tendons of the flexor digitorum profundus and flexor pollicis longus.

Behind, it is closely adherent to the anterior border of the articular disk of the distal radioulnar articulation.

Components
Some sources break down the components of the ligament as follows: radiolunate, radiocapitate, radiotriquetral, and radioscaphoid.

Other sources combine the radioscaphoid and radiocapitate into a "radioscaphocapitate".

References

External links
 

Ligaments of the upper limb